Emydura, the Australian short-necked turtles, are a genus of turtles in the family Chelidae. It was paraphyletic with Elseya. Consequently, it was split into two genera Myuchelys and Elseya by Thomson & Georges, 2009.
They can grow quite large, 30 cm or more is not unusual and have a life span of around 20–30 years. They generally do not hibernate as their warmer climate lets them remain active all year round; they also spend more time in the water than other varieties. 
They are considered omnivore but rely on a constant supply of meat to remain healthy, feeding on basically anything that will fit into their mouth.

They are characterised by a white strip starting at their nose and leading down their neck, as well as a more rigged shell.   
In Australia, the public require a basic reptiles licence to purchase these animals; taking from the wild is strictly prohibited.

Species 
Species and notable subspecies arranged according to most recent review of Georges & Thomson, 2010 with some modification after Kehlmaier et al. 2019 are:
 Northern red-faced turtle, Emydura australis, (Gray, 1841)
 Emydura gunaleni, Smales, McCord, Cann, & Joseph-Ouni, 2019
 Macquarie turtle, Emydura macquarii, (Gray, 1830)
 Murray river turtle, Emydura macquarii macquarii
 Krefft's turtle, Emydura macquarii krefftii
 Fraser island short-neck turtle, Emydura macquarii nigra
 Cooper creek turtle, Emydura macquarii emmotti
 Red-bellied short-necked turtle or Jardine River Turtle, Emydura subglobosa, (Krefft 1876)
 Red-bellied short-necked turtle, Emydura subglobosa subglobosa
 Worrell's short-necked turtle, Emydura subglobosa worrelli
 Northern yellow-faced turtle, Emydura tanybaraga, Cann, 1997
 Victoria river red-faced turtle, Emydura victoriae, (Gray 1841)

References

 
Turtle genera
Taxa named by Charles Lucien Bonaparte
Taxonomy articles created by Polbot
Turtles of Australia